Sam Behrens (born Stanley Birnbaum; July 24, 1950) is an American actor. He is known for his roles as Jake Meyer on the ABC daytime soap opera General Hospital, Dabnny Waleska in the CBS prime time soap opera Knots Landing and as Gregory Richards in the NBC daytime soap opera, Sunset Beach.

Life and career
Behrens was born Stanley Birnbaum to a Jewish family in Brooklyn, New York. He is of German ancestry on his paternal side. He has been married to Shari Belafonte since December 31, 1989. 

Behrens began his soap opera career on ABC's Ryan's Hope, playing Dr. Adam Cohen from 1979 to 1980. In 1980s. he moved from New York to Los Angeles, when was cast as Jake Meyer on General Hospital from 1983 to 1987. After recurring role on the NBC legal drama series, L.A. Law, Behrens was cast as Danny Waleska, Valene Ewing's (Joan Van Ark) new husband. He won Soap Opera Digest Award for Outstanding Villain: Prime Time for this role in 1991. Behrens also guest starred on The Facts of Life and Murder, She Wrote, and played major roles in a number of made for television movies in early 1990s. He also had the recurring role in the ABC drama series, Homefront in 1993. In film, Behrens had supporting parts in American Blue Note (1989), and Alive (1993).

From 1997 to 1999, Behrens starred alongside Lesley-Anne Down and other actors in the NBC daytime soap opera Sunset Beach produced by Aaron Spelling. He received two additional nominations for Soap Opera Digest Award for Outstanding Villain: Daytime.

Filmography

References

External links 
 

1950 births
20th-century American male actors
21st-century American male actors
American male film actors
American male soap opera actors
Jewish American male actors
Living people
Male actors from New York City
People from Brooklyn
21st-century American Jews